North Eleuthera is one of the districts of the Bahamas, on the island of Eleuthera. It has a  population (2010 census) of 3,247.

The Bluff, Lower Bogue, Current and Upper Bogue are the main settlements.

Sweetings Pond in North Central Eleuthera is recognized as a site of special ecological value, containing, it is estimated, a concentration of Ophiothrix oerstedi brittle stars at up to 434 individuals per square metre, because of the lack of marine predators.  Sweetings Pond is a  saltwater lake adjacent to the ocean but with no direct surface connection.  It is generally assumed that "blue holes" below the surface link the lake to the Atlantic Ocean.  More details on the phenomenon are set forth in a paper published in 1998 by David J. Hughes of the Dunstaffnage Marine Laboratory for the Scottish Association of Marine Sciences.

Sweetings Pond is also noted for the high density population of octopus vulgaris in the saltwater lake.

North Eleuthera has unusual coastal features.

Transportation
North Eleuthera Airport serves the area.

References

Districts of the Bahamas
Eleuthera